Vladislav Gussev (born 26 August 1986) is an Estonian footballer. He plays the position of striker and is 1.97 m tall and weighs 86 kg. He has played two games for the Estonia national football team.

In November 2008, he was handed a two-year ban by the Estonian Football Association for attempts of match fixing.

Personal
He has got an older brother, Vitali Gussev, who is also a footballer.

References

1986 births
Sportspeople from Tartu
Living people
Estonian people of Russian descent
Tartu JK Tammeka players
FC Valga players
FC TVMK players
Estonian footballers
Estonia international footballers

Association football forwards
JK Maag Tartu players